St. Vartan Armenian Cathedral in New York City is the first cathedral of the Armenian Apostolic Church to be constructed in North America. It is located in New York City on the corner of Second Avenue and 34th Street and was built to resemble the Saint Hripsime Church in Etchmiadzin (Vagharshapat). St. Vartan's was consecrated on April 28, 1968, by Vazgen I, Catholicos of Armenia and of All Armenians.

Architecture

 
Walker O. Cain, of the firm Steinman, Cain & White – successor firm to McKim, Mead and White – with  Édouard Utudjian of Paris as a consultant, designed the cathedral.

Around the dome there are various symbols, including the figure of Jesus Christ; the Holy Spirit represented by a dove; the Greek letters alpha and omega superimposed on the scriptures; wheat and grapes representing the Eucharist; and the Phoenix symbolizing resurrection etc. A series of high, narrow, stained-glass windows are set into the main walls of the cathedral below the dome depicting scenes in the life of Christ and early Christianity in Armenia. The patron saint of the cathedral, St. Vartan, is depicted fighting the Sassanid Persians who threatened the Armenian Church during the fifth century. Ecumenism is symbolized in the portrait of St. Nerses and the crosses of Christendom.

References

External links

 St. Vartan Cathedral page at Eastern Diocese of the Armenian Church of America website

20th-century Oriental Orthodox church buildings
34th Street (Manhattan)
Armenian Apostolic cathedrals in the United States
Armenian-American culture in New York City
Cathedrals in New York City
Churches completed in 1963
Churches in Manhattan
Kips Bay, Manhattan
Second Avenue (Manhattan)